Gunning for Vengeance is a 1946 American Western film directed by Ray Nazarro, which stars Charles Starrett, Marjean Neville, and The Trailsmen.

Cast list
 Charles Starrett as Steve Landry aka The Durango Kid
 Marjean Neville as Elaine Jenkins
 The Trailsmen 
 Smiley Burnette as himself
 Robert Kortman as Curley
 George Chesebro as Mike
 Frank LaRue as Mayor Garry
 Lane Chandler as Jim Clayburn
 Phyllis Adair as Belle Madden
 Robert Williams as Shorty
 Jack Kirk as Leader
 Nolan Leary as Jenkins
 Frank Fanning as Dr. Hawkins

References

External links
 
 
 

1946 films
1946 Western (genre) films
American Western (genre) films
American black-and-white films
Columbia Pictures films
Films directed by Ray Nazarro
1940s American films